Mawlay Hassan bin Mohammed, known as Hassan I, born in 1836 in Fes and died on 9 June 1894 in Tadla, was a sultan of Morocco from 12 September 1873 to 7 June 1894, as a ruler of the 'Alawi dynasty. He was proclaimed sultan after the death of his father Mawlay Muhammad bin Abd al-Rahman. Mawlay Hassan was among the most successful sultans. He increased the power of the makhzen in Morocco and at a time when so much of the rest of Africa was falling under foreign control, he brought in military and administrative reforms to strengthen the regime within its own territory, and he carried out an active military and diplomatic program on the periphery. He died on 9 June 1894 and was succeeded by his son Abd al-Aziz.

Reign

Early reign and rebellion in Fes 
 Son of the sultan Muhammad IV, Mawlay (Moulay) Hassan was proclaimed sultan of Morocco on the death of his father in 1873. His first action was to crush an urban revolt in the capital Fes in 1874, which he had to besiege for a few months. The tanners rose up in protest "raging like lions and tigers" through the streets of Fes, pillaging the house of Muhammad Bennis, the Minister of Finance, turning Fes into a battleground. Mawlay Hassan I, who was on campaign sent letters calling for the pacification of the city. Shortly after, the hated tax collectors were withdrawn, and the rebellion halted. The tax collectors soon reappeared, leading to the rebellion commencing again more violently. The local Fes militiamen took up positions in minarets of Fes al-Bali and fired down on the army, but the two sides later negotiated peace and the rebellion was definitely terminated. Of strong Arab culture, he did not know any foreign language, although Mawlay Hassan I was a conservative ruler, he realised the need for modernization and the reform policy of his father.

He strived to maintain the cohesion of his kingdom through political, military, and religious action, in the face of European threats on its periphery, and internal rebellions, He initiated reforms. He strived to ensure the loyalty of the great chiefs of the south. He did not hesitate to appoint local Caids like Sheikh Ma al-'Aynayn who gave him the Bay'a, the pledge of allegiance in Islamic Sharia law. He tried to modernize his army, and lead several expeditions to assert his authority, such as to the Sus in 1882 and 1886, to the Rif in 1887, and to Tafilalt in 1893.

Relations with Europe 
Sultan Hassan I managed to maintain the independence of Morocco while neighbouring states fell under European influence, such as Tunis which was conquered by France in 1881 and Egypt which was occupied by Britain in 1882.

Both Spain and France hoped for a weak Makhzen government of Morocco, while the British hoped for the opposite, a reformed Moroccan state which could stand on its own. Aware of this, Mawlay Hassan called for an international conference on the issue, and the Treaty of Madrid was signed on 3 July 1880 to limit the practice, an important event of Mawlay Hassan's reign. Instead of reducing foreign interference, the Makhzen had to grant concessions such as granting foreigners rights to own land in the countryside, something which Great Britain was pushing for all along. This was followed by French incursions into the region of Tuat in the south, which was considered Moroccan territory. This treaty effectively gave international approval and protection for lands which had been captured by foreign powers. This set the stage for the French Protectorate in Morocco beginning in 1912.

Since 1879, the British occupied Tarfaya and built a fortification there in 1882 known as Port Victoria. It was not until 1886 that the sultan sent a military expedition there, damaging the fort and forcing Donald MacKenzie to leave. The sultan's expedition to Sus in 1886 was followed a year later by the Spanish occupation of Dakhla on the Saharan coast. Mawlay Hassan responded by appointing a khalifa (governor) over the Sahara, Ma al-'Aynayn.

Military reform 
Mawlay Hassan I continued to expand the military reforms started by his father Muhammad IV. The new and reformed 'Askar al-Nizami introduced by sultan Abd al-Rahman in 1845 after the Battle of Isly was expanded by Mawlay Hassan I to the size of 25,000 men and 1,000 artillery. The sultan also enhanced the Moroccan coastal defences with batteries of large caliber cannon, and in 1888 built an arms factory in Fes known as Dar al-Makina, however production in it was little and costly. To train the reformed Moroccan army, Mawlay Hassan I sent students to London, but in 1876, the sultan hired Harry MacLean, a British officer based in Gibraltar, who designed a military uniform in Arab-style, and learned to speak excellent Arabic.

Every year from spring to fall, Mawlay Hassan I was on campaign, and lead expeditions to all parts of the kingdom. One of Mawlay Hassan's campaigns was dealing with the Darqawa uprising near Figuig in the fall of 1887, which was quickly suppressed. Particularly well known is the journey Hassan I undertook in 1893. He went from Fes (leaving on 29 June) to Marrakech, passing through the Tafilalt, the sand dunes of Erg Chebbi, the valley of the Dades with the majestic gorges of the Todra, Warzazat, the Kasbah of Aït Benhaddou, the high passage along Telouet, the Tichka pass (2260 m) in the high Atlas, Guelmim port of the Western Sahara. The voyage took six months and succeeded in its objective of reuniting and pacifying the tribes of several regions. The Krupp cannon he gave on this occasion to the caid of Telouet (member of the now famous Glaoua family) is still on display in the center of Warzazat. In 1881 he founded Tiznit.Hassan I appointed Mouha Zayani as Caid of the Zayanes in Khenifra in 1877. Mouha Zayani was to be an important figure in the 20th century colonial war against France. In 1887 he appointed sheikh Ma al-'Aynayn as his caid in Western Sahara. Ma al-'Aynayn too played an important role in the struggle for independence of Morocco.

Death 
On 9 June 1894, Mawlay Hassan I died from illness near Wadi al-Ubayd in the region of Tadla. Since the army was still in enemy territory, his chamberlain and Grand Wazir Ahmad bin Musa kept the death a secret, ordering the ministers to not reveal the news. The sultan's body was taken to Rabat and buried in Dar al-Makhzen there. Mawlay Hassan was succeeded by his son Abd al-Aziz, thirteen years old at the time, and ruled under the regency of his father's former Grand Wazir, Ahmad bin Musa, until his death from heart failure in 1900.

See also 
 'Alawi dynasty
 List of Sultans of Morocco
 History of Morocco
 Hassan I Dam
 Hassan I Airport

References

External links

 History of Morocco

'Alawi dynasty
Sultans of Morocco
1836 births
1894 deaths
Moroccan people of Arab descent
19th-century Arabs
People from Fez, Morocco
People from Marrakesh
19th-century Moroccan people
19th-century monarchs in Africa